The Huawei Mate X2 is an Android-based high end foldable smartphone produced by Huawei. The phone, unveiled on 22 February 2021, serves as the successor to the Mate X and Mate Xs. The phone was vastly redesigned from the previous generation, adopting a dual-screen design very similar to the Samsung Galaxy Z Fold 2.

Design 
Unlike the Mate X and Mate Xs, the Mate X2 has dual displays: a foldable 8 inch display that is concealed when folded, and a smaller 6.45 inch display on the outside. The display format is very similar to the Samsung Galaxy Z Fold 2, which was released the previous year. The quad-camera array is situated on the back, opposite the second screen, and a selfie camera is present in a cutout in the upper left-hand corner of that smaller display. Unlike the Galaxy Z Fold 2, the Mate X2 lacks a camera on the side of the main screen. The device comes in four colors, Black, White, Light Blue, and Rose Gold.

References

External links 
 Official website

Huawei smartphones
Android (operating system) devices
Phablets
Mobile phones introduced in 2021
Foldable smartphones
Mobile phones with multiple rear cameras
Mobile phones with infrared transmitter
Dual screen phone